Power is a 1962 novel by Howard Fast detailing the rise of the fictional Benjamin Holt, leader of the International Miner's Union, in the 1920s and 1930s.

Written from the perspective of a journalist – Alvin Cutter – it follows Ben Holt's life from a number of different perspectives, from meeting his wife to becoming a leading light in the industrial trade union movement.

1962 American novels
Novels by Howard Fast
Historical novels
Doubleday (publisher) books